Turbo marisrubri is a species of sea snail, a marine gastropod mollusk in the family Turbinidae, the turban snails.

Description
The shell grows to a length of 25 mm.

Distribution
This species occurs in the Red Sea.

References

External links

marisrubri
Gastropods described in 2001